Piratenpartij may refer to:
Pirate Party (Belgium)
Pirate Party (Netherlands)